Ablington is a village in the  county of Gloucestershire, England. Ablington is in the Cotswolds which has been designated by Natural England as an Area of Outstanding Natural Beauty (AONB).

Ablington Manor, a late 16th century country house with later additions, is a Grade I listed building.

The name 'Ablington' is derived from the 'estate called after Eadbald' (personal name Ēadbald + ing + tūn) and is recorded as Eadbaldingtun in 855, as Ablinton between 1209-1509 and Ablyngton between 1286 and 1601.

References

External links
Bibury Parish Council

Villages in Gloucestershire